Frogmore is a village  north of Radlett in Hertfordshire, and  south of St Albans. It is located in St Stephen civil parish, in St Albans District, in the county of Hertfordshire.

It includes the 19th century Holy Trinity church designed by Sir George Gilbert Scott, and Moor Mill featuring two water wheels, (not to be confused with Henry Fourdrinier's Frogmore Paper Mill in Apsley, Hemel Hempstead).

History
The village is mentioned in Daniel Paterson's travel guide of 1796, on the route from London to St. Albans.

Granada Publishing, whose imprints included Grafton and Panther Books, were based at Frogmore, until it was sold in 1983.

The Park Street and Frogmore Society "was formed to promote interest in local history and nature conservation and covers the three villages of Park Street, Frogmore and Colney Street".

Sport
Frogmore Cricket Club plays in Park Street.

Services
Halian Veterinary Centre is based at the old Red Cow pub, and treats cats and dogs.

References

Villages in Hertfordshire
City of St Albans